Richard Nicholson Ripley (23 June 1901 – 14 July 1996) was a British athlete who competed mainly in the 400 metres.

He competed for Great Britain in the 1924 Summer Olympics held in Paris, France in the 4 x 400 metre relay where he won the bronze medal with his teammates Edward Toms, George Renwick and Guy Butler.

References

External links
profile

1901 births
1996 deaths
Athletes (track and field) at the 1924 Summer Olympics
British male sprinters
Olympic athletes of Great Britain
Olympic bronze medallists for Great Britain
Medalists at the 1924 Summer Olympics
Olympic bronze medalists in athletics (track and field)